Lonchoptera lutea, the yellow spear-winged fly, is the type species of the genus Lonchoptera.

Adults vary a great deal in colour, from yellow to dark brown. The anteroventral bristle of the middle tibia is missing from the distal half. Scutellum brown to yellow. first and second antennal segments yellow, the third being dark, with a subapical arista.

Unlike most Lonchoptera, Lonchoptera lutea shows a marked preference for unshaded habitats. It is widespread and often very common throughout most of Europe, extending into parts of Asia.

References

Lonchopteridae
Muscomorph flies of Europe
Diptera of Asia
Insects described in 1809
Taxa named by Georg Wolfgang Franz Panzer